Köhntarkösz is the fifth studio album by French rock band Magma, released on 10 September 1974.

The title piece of the album forms a section of the Köhntarkösz cycle. Although first in order of release, it has now been formulated as the second part in a trilogy consisting of K.A. (Köhntarkösz Anteria), Köhntarkösz, and Ëmëhntëhtt-Rê.

"Coltrane Sündia" (translation: "Coltrane Rest in Peace") is an elegy for John Coltrane.

Track listing
Side one
 "Köhntarkösz (Part I)" (Christian Vander) – 15:22
 "Ork Alarm" (Jannick Top) – 5:28

Side two
 "Köhntarkösz (Part II)" (C. Vander) – 15:55
 "Coltrane Sündïa" (C. Vander) – 4:11

Personnel
Musicians
 Klaus Blasquiz – vocals, percussion
 Stella Vander – vocals
 Gerard Bikialo – pianos, Yamaha organ
 Michel Graillier – pianos, clavinet
 Brian Godding – guitar
 Jannick "Janik" Top – bass, cello, vocals, piano
 Christian Vander – drums, vocals, piano, percussion

Other
 "Loulou" Sarkissian "Mekanik" – stage manager
 Fabio Nicoli – design & art direction
 Giorgio Gomelsky – producer
 Malcolm Robertson – photography
 Simon Heyworth – engineer

References

External links
 
 
 

Magma (band) albums
1974 albums
Albums produced by Giorgio Gomelsky
A&M Records albums